The Greater Baltimore Committee was formed to revitalize Baltimore City by businessmen in 1954. Developer James Rouse chaired the urban renewal subcommittee.

In 1955, the committee pushed for legislation to build the Jones Falls Expressway.

GBC projects included 
Charles Center Plan
Jones Falls Expressway
Friendship Airport
Baltimore Civic Center
Maryland Port Authority
Mass Transit Administration

References

External links
 Greater Baltimore Committee official site

History of Baltimore
Urban planning in the United States